The men's slopestyle competition of the FIS Freestyle World Ski Championships 2011 was held at Park City Mountain Resort, Park City, Utah, United States on February 3, 2011 (qualifications and finals).

46 athletes from 16 countries competed.

Results

Qualification
The following are the results of the qualification.

Final

References

Slopestyle, men's